Henry Geldzahler (July 9, 1935 – August 16, 1994) was a Belgian-born American curator of contemporary art in the late 20th century, as well as a historian and critic of modern art. He is best known for his work at the Metropolitan Museum of Art and as New York City Commissioner of Cultural Affairs, and for his social role in the art world with a close relationship with contemporary artists.

He has been described as "the most powerful and controversial art curator alive" and the art critic of The New Yorker magazine Calvin Tomkins said ‘If you were involved in any way in the [cultural] world, you met Henry.’

Early life
Born in Antwerp, Belgium, Geldzahler's Jewish family emigrated to the United States in 1940. He graduated from Yale University in 1957, where he was a member of Manuscript Society. After graduating from Yale, he began work on a doctorate in art history at Harvard University, but he left graduate school in 1960.

Career 
In 1960, Geldzahler joined the staff of the Metropolitan Museum of Art in New York. He became the Curator for American Art there, and later the first Curator for 20th Century Art.

Among his closest friends were Andy Warhol and David Hockney.

His time at the Met is most known for his landmark 1969 exhibition, New York Painting and Sculpture: 1940-1970, which included his favorite contemporary work and became the talk of the town. It was the Museum's first exhibition of contemporary American art and marked both the inauguration of the newly established department of Contemporary Arts and the 100th anniversary of the Museum.

The exhibition featured 408 works in 35 galleries, by 43 artists including Arshile Gorky, Jackson Pollock, Frank Stella, David Smith, Jasper Johns, Mark Rothko, Warhol, and Robert Rauschenberg. "My guiding principles in deciding which artists to include in the exhibition have been the extent to which their work has commanded critical attention or significantly deflected the course of recent art", said Geldzahler in the press release of the exhibition.

In 1966, he was the United States commissioner to the Venice Biennale, for which he selected the American artists to be exhibited.

In 1966 he took a temporary leave from the Met to become the first director of the visual arts program of the National Endowment for the Arts, where he initiated a program of museum grants for the purchase of art made by living American artists.

In 1978 Geldzhaler left the Met and was succeeded in his role there by Thomas B. Hess.  He was then appointed the Commissioner of Cultural Affairs for New York City by Mayor Edward I. Koch. As an openly gay man who was part of the Koch administration and the conservative Metropolitan Museum of Art, Geldzahler contributed significant time and effort to AIDS-related causes.

After leaving his New York City government cultural post, he continued to write on art, and acted as an independent curator, working at the alternative space P.S. 1 and the austere high modernist Dia Art Foundation.

Writings 
Geldzhaler wrote, among other works:

 Catalog of New York Painting and Sculpture: 1940-1970 in 1969
 American Painting in the 20th Century (Metropolitan Museum of Art, 1965), 
 Charles Bell: The Complete Works, 1970-1990 (Abrams, 1991), and 
 Making It New: Essays, Interviews, and Talks (Harvest Books, 1996) with an introduction by Mr. Hockney.
 He co-wrote Art in Transit: Subway Drawings by Keith Haring (1984), 
 Andy Warhol: Portraits of the Seventies and Eighties (Thames and Hudson, 1993)

Death
Geldzahler died of liver cancer on August 16, 1994, at his home in Southampton, New York. He was 59 years old.

He is buried in Green River Cemetery in Springs, New York.

Depictions
Geldzahler is the subject of a documentary film called Who Gets to Call It Art? (2006) by Peter Rosen.
He is depicted in portraits by several of his artist friends, including a famous 1969 double portrait by David Hockney of Geldzahler with his then partner, painter Christopher Scott. Other artists made his portrait such as Andy Warhol, Frank Stella, Alice Neel, and the sculptor George Segal "There are lots of pictures of Henry. He didn’t have many mirrors in his home. He knew what he looked like just by asking people to make portraits of him.’ Hockney said.
Geldzahler is depicted in an Andy Warhol movie, Henry Geldzahler (1964), filmed silent and in black-and-white the first week of July 1964. The film consists of Geldzahler smoking a cigar and becoming increasingly uncomfortable for 97 minutes.
He appeared, as himself, in the 1974 David Hockney biopic, A Bigger Splash.

Footnotes

References
Tomkins, Calvin. "Profiles: Henry Geldzahler." New Yorker November 6, 1971: 58-60.
"Henry Geldzahler interview, 1970 Jan. 27" Sound recordings: 2 sound tape reels; 7 in. Transcript: 76 p. (microfilm reel 3197) Archives of American Art, Smithsonian Institution.

External links
 
 
 Henry Geldzahler Papers. Yale Collection of American Literature, Beinecke Rare Book and Manuscript Library.

1935 births
1994 deaths
20th-century American historians
American male non-fiction writers
American art critics
American art historians
American people of Belgian-Jewish descent
Belgian emigrants to the United States
Belgian Jews
Burials at Green River Cemetery
Deaths from cancer in New York (state)
Deaths from liver cancer
Harvard Graduate School of Arts and Sciences alumni
Horace Mann School alumni
Jewish American historians
Journalists from New York City
American LGBT people
People from Antwerp
People associated with the Metropolitan Museum of Art
Yale University alumni
Historians from New York (state)
20th-century American male writers
20th-century American Jews
20th-century LGBT people